is municipality in Agder county, Norway. It is located in the traditional district of Sørlandet. The administrative center is the town of Tvedestrand. There are many villages in the municipality including Dypvåg, Fiane, Gjeving, Gødderstad, Grønland, Kilen, Klåholmen, Krokvåg, Laget, Lyngør, Nesgrenda, Østerå, Sagesund, Sandvika, and Songe.

The town of Tvedestrand has a white-painted town center with irregular streets climbing steep hills around the harbor. The natural environment of the area makes it a tourist destination. The municipality includes numerous islands, which makes it popular in the summer for boaters. The number of people in the municipality practically doubles in the summer, due to vacationers. There are approximately 1,700 summer cottages ("hytter") around the fjord and coastal areas. Tvedestrand has over 2,000 buildings that are more than 100 years old.

The  municipality is the 298th largest by area out of the 356 municipalities in Norway. Tvedestrand is the 155th most populous municipality in Norway with a population of 6,115.

General information

The town of Tvedestrand was established as a municipality on 1 January 1838 (see formannskapsdistrikt law). During the 1960s, there were many municipal mergers across Norway due to the work of the Schei Committee. On 1 January 1960, the rural municipalities of Dypvåg (population: 1,805) and Holt (population: 3,759) were merged with the town of Tvedestrand (population: 868) to form a new municipality named Tvedestrand.

On 1 January 1962, the Strengereid area (population: 375) of Tvedestrand was transferred to neighboring Moland municipality. Then on 1 January 1964, the Holtegården area (population: 5) was transferred from Moland to Tvedestrand. The uninhabited Folevatnet area in Tvedestrand was transferred to the municipality of Risør on 1 January 1984.

Name
The town (and municipality) are named after the old Tveite farm where the town now sits. The first element is the genitive case of the farm name and the last element is strond which means "strand" or "beach".

Coat of arms
The coat of arms was granted on 4 April 1986. The official blazon is "Azure a tern volant argent". This means the arms have a blue field (background) and the charge is a tern, a type of local seabird. The tern has a tincture of argent which means it is commonly colored white, but if it is made out of metal, then silver is used. The blue color in the field and the tern were chosen to represent the sea since the municipality was historically dependent on it for its economy. The arms were designed by Daniel Rike.

Churches
The Church of Norway has three parishes within the municipality of Tvedestrand. It is part of the Aust-Nedenes prosti (deanery) in the Diocese of Agder og Telemark.

History
Holt Church probably dates from the twelfth century and it has an ancient baptismal font. The interior was decorated by Torsten Hoff.

Around 1600, Tvedestrand was mainly a harbour for the Berge and Tveite farms’ boats, hence the name Tvedestrand (strand means beach or coast in Norwegian).

Lyngør was the site of the Battle of Lyngør between English and Dano-Norwegian forces during the Napoleonic Wars resulting in the sinking of the  frigate of the Dano-Norwegian forces, Najaden by the British ship-of-the-line Dictator in 1812.

The town, as it now exists, was built in the 19th century as a harbour for Norway's longest existing iron works, Næs jernverk. Lying in the parish of Holt, Næs jernverk has one of the largest and most significant of the surviving mansions in Sørlandet, built by Ulrich Schnell. Schnell bought up various iron works in the neighborhood and set up several sawmills in the district. He obtained a special license to export timber directly from Tvedestrand, establishing the basis for an international harbor.

Government
All municipalities in Norway, including Tvedestrand, are responsible for primary education (through 10th grade), outpatient health services, senior citizen services, unemployment and other social services, zoning, economic development, and municipal roads. The municipality is governed by a municipal council of elected representatives, which in turn elect a mayor.  The municipality falls under the Agder District Court and the Agder Court of Appeal.

Municipal council
The municipal council of Tvedestrand is made up of 25 representatives that are elected to four year terms. Currently, the party breakdown is as follows:

Geography
Tvedestrand municipality lies between the towns of Arendal to the southwest and Risør to the northeast. The municipality also borders the municipalities of Arendal, Risør, Froland, Åmli, and Vegårshei.

Tvedestrand belongs to the geographical region of Sørlandet in the Østre Agder area of Agder county. The town itself lies at the end of a picturesque fjord, Tvedestrandfjorden, which is the name for the inner part of the Oksefjorden (originally Ufsefjorden, meaning the fjord with steep, rocky sides). The municipality also encompasses the islands Borøy, Sandøy, and Askerøya as well as the unique village of Lyngør which lies on several small islands. Lyngør was acclaimed "Europe's best preserved village" by Europa Nostra in 1991. Lyngør Lighthouse is located by the village.

The river Storelva, one of the Southern Coast's best salmon and sea trout rivers, flows past the Næs jernverk and ultimately out into the Sandnesfjorden.

Climate
Tvedestrand has a temperate oceanic climate (Cfb, marine west coast), with autumn as the wettest season and spring as the driest. August 1975.

Geology
A number of rare minerals are found in Tvedestrand:
 Sunstone, a rare feldspar exhibiting in certain directions a brilliant spangled appearance, which has led to its use as a gemstone.
 A rare yttrium phosphate mineral Xenotime.
 Thulite (also called rosaline), an opaque, massive pink variety of the mineral zoisite.

Attractions

Tvedestrand is recognized as a book town, a small village with a large number of second-hand or antiquarian book shops.
Interesting Places in Tvedestrand municipality:
 Lyngør, a cluster of offshore islands which have been described as the 'Skagerrak Venice' and proclaimed by the European Commission to be “Europe’s best preserved village.”
 Sagesund village
 Sandøya island, including the villages of Kilen and Klåholmen
 Borøya island

Notable residents

 Peder Johnsen (1783 in Tvedestrand – 1836) a sailor, rep. at the Norwegian Constituent Assembly
 Knud Knudsen (1812 in Tvedestrand – 1895) an educator, author, linguist and philologist
 Elise Wærenskjold (1815 in Dypvåg – 1895) a Norwegian-American writer, temperance leader and early pioneer in Texas
 Erik Eriksen (1820 in Lyngør - 1888) a Norwegian polar captain
 Arne Garborg (1851–1924), an author, founded and edited the Tvedestrandsposten newspaper (still published in 2019)
 Jens Holmboe (1880 in Tvedestrand – 1943) a Norwegian botanist, professor and author
 Theo Findahl (1891 in Tvedestrand – 1976) a teacher, journalist and foreign correspondent
 Alfred Engelsen (1893 – 1966 in Tvedestrand) a gymnast and diver, team gold medallist at the 1912 Summer Olympics
 Kristian Vilhelm Koren Schjelderup Jr. (1894 in Dypvåg – 1980) a Norwegian Lutheran theologian, author, and bishop of the Diocese of Hamar 1947 to 1964
 Harald K. Schjelderup (1895 in Dypvåg – 1974) a Norwegian physicist, philosopher and psychologist; Norway's first professor of psychology 
 Rolv Werner Erichsen (1899 in Holt – 1988) a Norwegian newspaper editor
 Trond Bergh (born 1946 in Tvedestrand) a Norwegian economic historian, writer and academic
 Ketil Bjørnstad (born 1952) a pianist, composer and author; he lived in Tvedestrand in the 1970s/80s. His psychological thriller Twilight is based there
 Gina Lund (born 1962) a Norwegian civil servant and politician, brought up in Tvedestrand
 Jenny Hval (born 1980) a singer-songwriter, record producer, musician and novelist

International relations

Twin towns — Sister cities
The following cities are twinned with Tvedestrand:
  Lysekil, Västra Götaland County, Sweden

References

External links

Municipal fact sheet from Statistics Norway 
Tvedestrand municipality site 
A UK site on Tvedestrand municipality
Information on minerals in Tvedestrand
A map of Tvedestrand municipality
The museum at Næs Jernverks
Map of Aust-Agder including Tvedestrand municipality 
The island of Borøya 
Culture  
The newspaper Garborg founded  

 
Municipalities of Agder
1838 establishments in Norway